Otto Mellies (19 January 1931 – 26 April 2020) was a German actor on stage, in film and television, and a voice actor. He was  known for his performance of the title role of Lessing's Nathan the Wise on stage 325 times.

Life and career 
Mellies was born in Schlawe, now Sławno in Poland. At age 16, he applied successfully for acting education at the Staatstheater Schwerin, learning with Lucie Höflich, the director of drama. He worked at various theatres, such as in Neustrelitz, Stralsund, Rostock and Erfurt, learning a broad repertoire. He played the Tempelherr in Lessing's Nathan der Weise in Stralsulnd at age 20.

From 1956, he was a member of the Deutsches Theater Berlin, engaged by Wolfgang Langhoff. He turned to character roles such as Pylades in the 1976 production of Goethe's Iphigenie by Thomas Langhoff, with Inge Keller in the title role.  During his 55 years on stage, he excelled as Lessing's Nathan, staged by Friedo Solter in 1987, which he played 325 times.

Mellies died on 26 April 2020.

Filmography

References

External links 
 
 

1931 births
2020 deaths
German male film actors
German male stage actors
People from Sławno
People from the Province of Pomerania